Joannes Zacheus (fl. 1554/1569) was a composer of the Franco-Flemish School.

Not much is still known about Zacheus. When the publisher and editor Jacob Bathen published an anthology of Dutch songs titled Dat ierste boeck vanden nieuwe Duijtsche liedekens, he included two songs for four voices by Zacheus:

Ic en can mij niet bedwinghen (in a Leuven edition dating from 1572 by Petrus Phalesius the Elder, Ick en can mij niet bedwinghen is credited to Jan Belle).
Miins liefkens bruijn ooghen (is thought to be an adaptation of the setting of this song by Carolus Souliaert).

References 

 Susan Lempert, verhandeling Studien zu den Chansons und Motetten von Matheus Pipelare, Hamburg, 2004 
 Jan Willem Bonda, De meerstemmige Nederlandse liederen van de vijftiende en zestiende eeuw. Hilversum, Verloren, 1996. 

16th-century Franco-Flemish composers
Flemish composers
Year of death unknown
Year of birth unknown